Anne-Sophie Bittighoffer (born 24 November 1977) is a French former professional tennis player.

Bittighoffer, who had a career best ranking of 339 in the world, featured as a wildcard in the main draw of the 1995 Internationaux de Strasbourg. She was beaten in the first round by fifth seed Lori McNeil.

ITF finals

Singles: 2 (1–1)

References

External links
 
 

1977 births
Living people
French female tennis players